Until the End of Time is the third studio album by New Zealand rock band, Opshop.

Background and release
Jason Kerrison, Opshop's lead singer, said of the title of Until the End of Time "it's more of a romantic notion than a cataclysmic one. Human society has found itself in a time where you've got an unprecedented number of cultures predicting an end time, and you know, is that a sheer fluke."

The album was released on the Rhythmethod label on 2 August 2010.

Critical reception
Russell Baillie from The New Zealand Herald gave the album five-out-of-five stars, saying that "its sonic sheen and sincerity is just going to reinforce their status as the era's band of the people".

Chart performance
Until the End of Time debuted on the New Zealand Albums Chart on 9 August 2010 at number one.

Track listing

 "Pins and Needles" – 4:33
 "Love Will Always Win" – 4:00
 "Through" – 5:26
 "Paradox" – 3:33
 "Madness & Other Allergies" – 3:55
 "Monsters Under the Bed" – 4:25
 "A Fine Mess We're In" – 4:35
 "Sunday's Best Clothes" – 4:13
 "Everything to Someone" – 4:09
 "Nowhere Fast" – 4:08
 "All for You" – 4:06
 "Clarity" – 4:32
 "Prophecy" - 3:04

Source: iTunes Store

Personnel
 Clint Harris – bass guitar, vocals
 Bobby Kennedy – drums
 Jason Kerrison – guitars, keyboards, vocals
 Matt Treacy – vocals, guitars

Source: Marbecks

References

External links

2010 albums
Opshop albums
Albums produced by Greg Haver